Dinesh Gopalsamy (Dinesh Gopalsamy) is an Indian Tamil actor. He made his film debut in  Thirumanam Enum Nikkah . Debuted in the TV series "Mahan" aired on 2010. He became popular by acting in the TV series  Poove Poochudava  and  Nachiyarpuram .<ref>{{cite web | url = https://cinema.vikatan.com/television/serial-actors-rachita-and-dinesh-interview | title = `` Everybody Asks How To Color ..!  - Rachita | work = | publisher = cinema.vikatan.com}}</ref>

Personal
Dinesh Gopalsamy studied at Srivi Lions Matriculation High School. He holds a bachelor's degree from Loyola College, Chennai. He made his film debut in 2014  Thirumanam Enum Nikkah . He married actress Rachitha Mahalakshmi, who co-starred in the 2011 TV series "Pirivom Sandippom" aired on Vijay TV. Dinesh co-starred with Rachitha Mahalakshmi in  Mr & Mrs Khiladis'' aired on  Zee Tamil TV in 2016.

TV Series

References

1985 births
Living people
Tamil actors
Indian male television actors